The Ta Kou marbled gecko (Gekko takouensis) is a species of gecko. It is endemic to southern Vietnam.

References

Gekko
Reptiles described in 2010
Reptiles of Vietnam
Endemic fauna of Vietnam